The Cross Internacional Zornotza is an annual cross country running event which takes place in January in Amorebieta-Etxano (Zornotza), the Basque Country, Spain. The competition was first held in 1954 and has taken place every year since, with the sole exception of 1961. Organised by the Club Deportiva Zornotza, the event began as a mainly national-level competition and it started to attract elite international competitors from the mid-1980s onwards.

Zornotza has previously been an IAAF and European Athletics status meeting, as well as being in the now-defunct IAAF World Cross Challenge circuit, but is not currently part of an international cross country series. The race suffered from economic problems leading up to the period around 2010, but organisers continued its focus of attracting some of the sport's top competitors. The competition's course, the Jauregibarria, played host to the 1993 IAAF World Cross Country Championships.

The competition features two elite level races: a 10.7 km race for men and a 6.7 km contest for women. In addition to these, several shorter races are held for local runners and youths. Past winners of the elite race include two-time Olympic champion Derartu Tulu. Mariano Haro, a Spanish World Cross medallist, has won the competition more than any other athlete (seven) and won five times consecutively in the mid-1970s.

Past senior race winners

National era

International era

Winners by country

References

List of winners
Gasparovic, Juraj (2011-01-10). Cross Zornotza. Association of Road Racing Statisticians. Retrieved on 2011-01-21.

External links
2011 race report from ABC

Cross country running competitions
Athletics competitions in Spain
Recurring sporting events established in 1954
Sport in Biscay
Cross country running in Spain
Annual sporting events in Spain
1954 establishments in Spain